Raymond Raymond (January 18, 1905 – March 18, 1978) was a Canadian lawyer and politician. First elected to represent the riding of Terrebonne, Quebec as a Liberal in the 1957 federal election he was a Member of Parliament in the House of Commons of Canada for less than a year, losing his seat in the 1958 federal election that returned a Conservative majority government.

Electoral record

External links
 

1905 births
1978 deaths
Members of the House of Commons of Canada from Quebec
Liberal Party of Canada MPs
Lawyers in Quebec
People from Laurentides